By the end of his second and final term on January 20, 2017, United States President Barack Obama had exercised his constitutional power to grant the executive clemency—that is, "pardon, commutation of sentence, remission of fine or restitution, and reprieve"—to 1,927 individuals convicted of federal crimes. Of the acts of clemency, 1,715 were commutations (including 504 life sentences) and 212 were pardons. Most individuals granted executive clemency by Obama had been convicted on drug charges, and had received lengthy and sometimes mandatory sentences at the height of the war on drugs.

Obama holds the record for the largest single-day use of the clemency power, granting 330 commutations on January 19, 2017, his last full day in office. He also issued more commutations than the past 13 presidents combined.

Constitutional provision 

The pardon powers of the president are outlined in Article Two of the United States Constitution (Section 2, Clause 1), which provides:

Definitions 
A pardon is an executive order granting clemency for a conviction, it may be granted "at any point after the ... commission" of the crime. As per Justice Department regulations, convicted persons may only apply five or more years after their sentence has been completed. However, the president's power to pardon is not restricted by any temporal constraints except that the crime must have been committed. Its practical effect is the restoration of civil rights and statutory disabilities (e.g., firearm rights, occupational licensing) associated with a past criminal conviction. In rarer cases, such as the pardon of Richard Nixon, a pardon can also halt criminal proceedings and prevent an indictment.

A commutation is the mitigation of the sentence of someone currently serving a sentence for a crime pursuant to a conviction, without vacating the conviction itself.

Pardons and commutations 

This is a partial list of people pardoned or granted clemency by a United States president, ordered by date of pardon or commutation. For an updated list, see U.S. Department of Justice.

Pardons

December 3, 2010

May 20, 2011

November 21, 2011

March 1, 2013

December 19, 2013

January 17, 2017 
During his 4th to last day in office, Obama pardoned James Cartwright, who was awaiting sentencing for giving false statements to federal investigators, and Willie McCovey was pardoned for tax evasion.

Commutations

November 21, 2011

December 19, 2013

July 13, 2015
On this day, Obama announced he would be commuting the sentences of 46 drug offenders.

June 3, 2016

On this day, Obama announced he would be commuting the sentences of 42 offenders.

December 20, 2016
Obama granted 78 commutations on this day.

January 17, 2017 

On this day, Obama pardoned 64 individuals and commuted the sentence of 209 individuals (109 of whom faced life sentences). These included Chelsea Manning and Oscar López Rivera, enabling them to be released from prison on May 17, 2017.

January 19, 2017 

Obama commuted the prison sentences of 330 federal inmates on Thursday, January 19, 2017, his last full day in office. Obama did so, as one of his final acts in office, in order to reduce what he viewed as overly harsh punishments.

See also 

 Article Two of the United States Constitution
 List of people pardoned or granted clemency by the president of the United States
 List of people pardoned by George W. Bush
 List of people pardoned by Bill Clinton

Notes

 As he finishes his second year in office, Obama pardons nine people

References

External links
Clemency Statistics by President, U.S. Office of the Pardon Attorney

People pardoned by Barack Obama
People pardoned by Barack Obama
Pardoned by Obama
People pardoned
+Obama, Barack
Presidential pardons